Master Spy: The Robert Hanssen Story (2002) is a made-for-television movie based on the story of Robert Hanssen, who was charged with and convicted of selling American secrets to the Soviet Union.  It was written by Norman Mailer and directed by Lawrence Schiller.

Plot

Cast 
 William Hurt as Robert Hanssen
 Mary-Louise Parker as Bonnie Hanssen
 David Strathairn as Jack Hoschouer
 Ron Silver as Mike Fine
 Hilit Pace as Priscilla Galey
 Wayne Knight as Walter Ballou
 Peter Boyle as Howard Hanssen
 Alexandre Kalugin as Victor Cherkashin
 Lev Prygunov as Leonid Shebarshin
 Scott Gibson as Richard Timber
 Cara Pifko as Jane Hanssen
 Other members of the cast included Dmitri Chepovetsky, Lubomir Mykytiuk, Barry Flatman, Nola Auguston, Kate Trotter, Eugene Lipinski, Bruce Hunter, Colin Fox, Frank Moore, Terry Vnesa, Yvonee Gaudry, Craig Eldridge, Sarah Lafleur, Arnold Pinnock, Lawrence Schiller, Oleg Kalugin, Ned Vukovic, Jacqueline Pillon, and Neil Crone.

Production 
Master Spy: The Robert Hanssen Story was filmed in Moscow, Hong Kong, Hawaii, Toronto, and Washington, D.C.

The film was produced by Oakdale Prods. and distributed by Fox Television. The executive producers of the film were Norman Mailer and Lawrence Schiller, the producer was Kay Hoffman, the director was Lawrence Schiller, and the writer was Norman Mailer.

Reception 
Master Spy: The Robert Hanssen Story received reviews from publications including Variety, The A.V. Club, the Tampa Bay Times, DVD Talk, the San Francisco Chronicle, and Christopher Null of Filmcritic.com.

Phil Gallo, writing for Variety, wrote that the film was "A psychological drama that fails to haunt, intrigue or even repel its audience, “Master Spy” is a slowly told, drawn-out examination of an FBI agent who fights the demons of his upbringing, Catholicism and unbearable financial debt. Robert Hanssen’s story of how he came to sell FBI documents to the KGB is more background than plot as scribe Norman Mailer and director Lawrence Schiller stick with the double spy’s family life as the crux of this four-hour mini. William Hurt delivers a consistent performance as the droll, slightly base Hanssen and Mary-Louise Parker is excellent at living within the skin of his devoutly Catholic wife, Bonnie. Over four hours covering 33 years, we see little change in the Hanssens — their dedication to each other never wavers, they maintain traditional roles in the home and religion is their big fallback."

An article in the Tampa Bay Times noted that the film left out some elements of Hanssen’s life.

References

Further reading 

 
 
 Overlong series looks into life of Soviet mole
 Creators say CBS spy movie strives to capture the facts
 Hurt excels, but apologetic 'Master Spy' runs too long
 Real-life spy story bears no resemblance to Bond
 Plodding 'Master Spy' hits a wall in opener
 Tale of FBI turncoat needs taking in
 Life of FBI traitor
 'Master Spy'
 Spy's story worth telling, not this way
 'Spy' is all very cloak-and-dagger, bit without cloaks and daggers

2002 television films
2002 films
Films with screenplays by Norman Mailer
Films directed by Lawrence Schiller